Matter Has A Breaking Point is an album by the indie rock band Twothirtyeight.

Track listing 
 "Just Dropping (A Line)"
 "To the Concerned"
 "A Beautiful Disease"
 "This Is Why I Wait"
 "Suitcases For Always"
 "Tales From Your Nightstand"
 "You Made A Way For Moses"
 "Far From Comfort"

Matter Has A Breaking Point
Matter Has A Breaking Point
Matter Has A Breaking Point